Flatpack Empire is a British documentary television series that was first broadcast on BBC Two between 6 and 20 February 2018. The three-part series goes behind the scenes of the world's largest and best-known furniture retailer, IKEA with narrator Olivia Colman.

Production 
The series was commissioned by Patrick Holland, Controller, BBC Two, and Jamie Balment, Commissioning Editor, BBC Documentaries. The series was produced in partnership with the Open University.

The series explores the "distinctly Swedish philosophy behind the company’s extraordinary cultural influence and commercial success".

Critical reception
The Daily Telegraph described the documentary as "gloomy" and The Guardian describing the culture shown in IKEA as "less like a furniture shop and more like a flatpack cult".

References

External links
 

2018 British television series debuts
2018 British television series endings
2010s British reality television series
BBC television documentaries
English-language television shows
2010s British documentary television series
IKEA